The 544th Aircraft Control and Warning Group is an inactive United States Air Force unit. It was assigned to the 27th Air Division, and last stationed at Norton Air Force Base, California. It was inactivated on 6 February 1952.

This command and control organization was responsible for the organization, manning and equipping of new Aircraft Control and Warning (Radar) units.  It was dissolved with the units being assigned directly to the 27th AD.

Lineage

 Established as the 544th Aircraft Control and Warning Group
 Activated on 8 October 1950
 Inactivated on 6 February 1952
 Disbanded on 21 September 1984

Stations
 probably Hamilton AFB, California 8 October 1950
 Norton AFB, California 27 November 1950 - 6 February 1952

Components

 669th Aircraft Control and Warning Squadron
 Fort MacArthur, California, 27 November 1950 - 6 February 1952
 670th Aircraft Control and Warning Squadron
 Camp Cooke, California, 27 November 1950 - 6 February 1952
 685th Aircraft Control and Warning Squadron
 Norton AFB, California, 27 November 1950 - 6 February 1952

 750th Aircraft Control and Warning Squadron
 Atolia, California, 8 October 1950 - 6 February 1952
 751st Aircraft Control and Warning Squadron
 Mount Laguna AFS, California, 27 November 1950 - 6 February 1952

See also
 List of United States Air Force aircraft control and warning squadrons

References

 
 Grant, C.L., The Development of Continental Air Defense to 1 September 1954, (1961), USAF Historical Study No. 126

External links

Aerospace Defense Command units
Air control groups of the United States Air Force
1950 establishments in California
1952 disestablishments in California